is a Japanese voice actor and singer from Fukuroi, Shizuoka who is affiliated with Hibiki. He is known for his roles as Ren Nanahoshi in From Argonavis and Kyouya Hashiba in Remake Our Life!.

Career
Itō graduated from the Nagoya College of Music, where he majored in the trumpet. In 2013, he formed the music unit , which was active until 2016. After moving to Tokyo in 2016, he would continue music activities as an independent musician. In 2018, he was cast as the character Ren Nanahoshi in the franchise From Argonavis, later reprising the role for its 2020 anime series. In 2021, he played Zakusa Ishigame in Cardfight!! Vanguard Overdress and Kyouya Hashiba in Remake Our Life!. He also received the Best New Actor Award at the 15th Seiyu Awards.

Filmography

Anime
2020
Argonavis from BanG Dream!, Ren Nanahoshi

2021
Cardfight!! Vanguard Overdress, Zakusa Ishigame
Remake Our Life!, Kyouya Hashiba

2022
Cardfight!! Vanguard will+Dress, Zakusa Ishigame
I've Somehow Gotten Stronger When I Improved My Farm-Related Skills, Reaks

2023
The Girl I Like Forgot Her Glasses, Kaede Komura

TBA
Station Idol Latch!, Miharu Suwa

References

External links
Agency profile 

1992 births
BanG Dream!
Living people
Male voice actors from Shizuoka Prefecture